This is a list of Swedish television related events from 1967.

Events
24 February - Östen Warnerbring is selected to represent Sweden at the 1967 Eurovision Song Contest with his song "Som en dröm". He is selected to be the ninth Swedish Eurovision entry during Melodifestivalen 1967 held in Stockholm.

Debuts

Television shows

1960s
Hylands hörna (1962-1983)

Ending this year

Births
20 July - Agneta Sjödin, TV host

Deaths

See also
1967 in Sweden